Dawsonite is a mineral composed of sodium aluminium carbonate hydroxide, chemical formula NaAlCO3(OH)2. It crystallizes in the orthorhombic crystal system. It is not mined for ore.  It was discovered in 1874 during the construction of the Redpath Museum in a feldspathic dike on the campus of McGill University on the Island of Montreal, Canada.  It is named after geologist Sir John William Dawson (1820–1899).

The type material is preserved in the collection of the Redpath Museum.

See also
List of minerals
List of minerals named after people
Dihydroxialumini sodium carbonate, the commercial (artificial) form, used as an antacid

References

Sodium minerals
Aluminium minerals
Carbonate minerals
Orthorhombic minerals
Minerals in space group 74
Luminescent minerals